Enn Tõugu (20 May 1935 Tallinn – 30 March 2020) was an Estonian computer scientist and mathematician. He dealt with system programming, declarative languages and topics related to artificial intelligence.

In 1960s, he focused on the design and construction of the original STEM mini computer (:et).

He was a candidate in 1996 Estonian presidential election.

Awards
 1987 State Prize of the USSR
 1995 the Medal of the Estonian Academy of Sciences
 2001 Order of the White Star, III class

References

1935 births
2020 deaths
Estonian computer scientists
Estonian mathematicians
Recipients of the USSR State Prize
Recipients of the Order of the White Star, 3rd Class